Navjot Kaur Sidhu is an Indian politician and former member of Punjab Legislative Assembly. She was elected to assembly in 2012 from Amritsar East as a candidate of Bharatiya Janata Party.

She was appointed Chief Parliamentary Secretary. She is doctor by profession and served in Govt. Rajindra Hospital, Patiala before resigning in January 2012 to enter politics. She is married to former cricketer and Congress leader Navjot Singh Sidhu. They have a son named Karan and daughter Rabia.

Kaur announced her resignation from the BJP on her Facebook page, before launching an attack on Chief Minister Parkash Singh Badal in another post. Navjot Kaur, who along with her husband, cricketer-turned-politician Navjot Singh Sidhu, had not been enjoying the best of relations with her party's Punjab unit as well as the SAD leadership, posted a message on 1 April 2016. It said, "Finally I have resigned from the BJP. The burden is over."

Navjot Kaur exposed a senior state government medical officer running a private hospital in Mohali through a sting operation. The then central Health Minister Ghulam Nabi Azad invited Sidhu, to become a member of the National PNDT Committee for reforms in the Health Department.

Electoral performance

References

Members of the Punjab Legislative Assembly
Living people
Politicians from Amritsar
Indian women medical doctors
21st-century Indian women politicians
21st-century Indian politicians
Bharatiya Janata Party politicians from Punjab
Year of birth missing (living people)
Women members of the Punjab Legislative Assembly